Crown Point Lighthouse is an active lighthouse located in Scarborough, on the south west extremity of Tobago in the nearby the airport.

See also
 List of lighthouses in Trinidad and Tobago

References

Lighthouses in Trinidad and Tobago